Znovuzrození (Rebirth) is a 1983 bronze sculpture by Josef Malejovský (1914-2003). It is installed outside the National Theatre in Prague, Czech Republic, on a piazzetta which was named "Náměstí Václava Havla" in 2016 to honor the first Czech president. The statue is a popular subject to artistic interventions - it has been wrapped in bubblegum-like cover, dressed in Carmen costume or into a lookalike of the famous Woman In Gold painting by Gustav Klimt.

Gallery

References

External links

 

New Town, Prague
Outdoor sculptures in Prague